Priority Bicycles is an American bicycle manufacturer based in New York City.

The company was founded in 2012 by Dave Weiner, who quit his job as North American CEO of a software company to start a bicycle company. Weiner crowdfunded the startup company with a Kickstarter campaign in July 2014, with users who donated $350 promised a bicycle from the first shipment, and reached his funding goal of $30,000 within hours of launching. By the end of the 30-day campaign, Priority had received $556,286 of startup capital.

The bicycles are aimed at commuters, and are designed to minimize maintenance requirements by using a belt drive rather than a bicycle chain, and puncture-resistant tires with double-wall rims.

References

External links

Cycle manufacturers of the United States
Manufacturing companies based in New York City
Vehicle manufacturing companies established in 2012
American companies established in 2012
2012 establishments in New York City